Datu Mustapha bin Datu Harun, or Tun Mustapha for short (31 July 1918 – 2 January 1995), was a Malaysian politician who served as the 3rd Chief Minister of Sabah from May 1967 to November 1975 and the 1st Yang Di-Pertua Negara from September 1963 to September 1965 and President of the United Sabah National Organisation (USNO). He is considered by some to be one of the founding leaders of Sabah and was an important party in the negotiations leading to the formation of Malaysia on 16 September 1963. He is sometimes known  as the "Father of Independence of Sabah" (Bapa Kemerdekaan Sabah) and also the "Father of Development of Sabah" (Bapa Pembangunan Sabah).

Personal life 
Datu Mustapha was born in Kampung Limau-limauan, Kudat. He is of Suluk-Bajau origin (Bajau Bannaran/Bajau Kudat and not Bajau Ubian).

World War II 
During World War II, he was wanted by the Japanese forces because of the rebellions he led against them, mainly in Kudat during the Japanese occupation. But when they could not find him, they caught his younger brother and eventually killed him because his brother would not reveal where he was hiding. Albert Kwok invited Mustapha to join in the Jesselton Revolt but he advised Kwok to wait and prepare, saying the time wasn't right for insurrection. However, Kwok was forced to launch the revolt ahead of schedule because the Chinese were going to be subjected to conscription by the Japanese. Kwok was joined in the revolt along with Suluks and Bajaus under Panglima Ali. The revolt failed and the Japanese engaged in large scale massacres of indigenous civilians, including women and children especially from the Suluks community.

Political career

Appointment to Yang di-Pertua Negara of Sabah 
Mustapha founded the party United Sabah National Organisation, better known by the acronym USNO. He, together with Donald Stephens, are often credited as important figures in Sabah in bringing forth Sabah's independence and in the formation of Malaysia in 1963. When Malaysia was formed on 16 September 1963, he became the first Yang di-Pertua Negara (governor) of Sabah.

Appointment to chief minister of Sabah 
In the 1967 state election, USNO won, and Mustapha became the third Chief Minister of Sabah.

When he was Chief Minister, his relationship with the Malaysian central government was not very good.  Although the central government, represented by the Barisan Nasional (BN) coalition, was a partner of USNO, they were worried about certain stances taken by Mustapha, in particular, his intention or threat to secede Sabah from Malaysia. Mustapha also refused to sign an oil agreement with the federal government which stated that only 5% of Sabah's oil revenue will be given to the state. Mustapha demanded at least 30% for the development of Sabah where it will be drilled.

Mustapha also succeeded in converting a significant number of non-Muslim indigenous people in Sabah into Muslim. Aside from his involvement in politics and religion (Islam), he also made contributions in the education of Sabah. He mooted the idea of forming Sabah Foundation (Yayasan Sabah) and was responsible in setting up the first university, Universiti Kebangsaan Malaysia (UKM) Sabah Campus, and also the setting up of ITM (Institut Teknologi Mara).

He was also the Deputy Head of PERKIM, when the late Tunku was the President and also the time of Patinggi Taib. He was also the head of United Sabah Islamic Association (USIA) and a member of RISEAP.

In 1975, USNO secretary-general Harris Salleh left the party to form BERJAYA. This party was backed up by the federal government thru the oil lobby. In the 1976 state election, BERJAYA won and Mustapha was ousted from power.

Formation of Sabah chapter of UMNO 
Since his ouster in 1976, Tun Mustapha had been trying to initiate a merger of his party USNO with peninsular-based United Malays National Organisation (UMNO) in a bid to return to the corridors of power in Sabah. However, the UMNO supreme council was hesitant on a merger because their party did not accept non-Malay/non-Muslim members. Besides, the UMNO president at that time, Tun Hussein Onn was uneasy with Tun Mustapha's close relationship with UMNO's anti-Hussein faction. Mustapha remained active in politics, leading USNO and contesting in four subsequent state elections (1981, 1985, 1986, and 1990). Although they never won again, they still managed to win several seats in the state assembly. They also remained a partner of BN at the federal government level (as opposed to the state level). After the 1990 state election, he teamed up with Harris Salleh again, after BERJAYA themselves were ousted by Parti Bersatu Sabah (PBS). This resulted in a merger of USNO and BERJAYA to create the Sabah chapter of UMNO. Mustapha became its first chief of UMNO Sabah.

Controversies

Arrests of Roman Catholic priests and the Islamisation of Sabah State 

Mustapha is remembered by the Catholics of Sabah for imposing to the letter the immigration laws by denying foreign priests who have not obtained permanent residency on the extension of their visas. All the priests who object to their expulsion for doing religious works among the Catholics were arrested by using his powers as the Chairman of the State Security Operation Committee and CM of Sabah State Government.

Under his orders, on 2 December 1972, the police made a raid at the missions at Tambunan, Papar, Bundu Tuhan and Kuala Penyu. The raids at Tambunan and Papar were successful, timed early in the morning with the church bell ropes cut to prevent it from being used to warn the people. The priests were at Kapayan long before the parishioners were aware of it. The raid at Kuala Penyu was initially a fiasco with a reception committee of 600 Catholics. To avoid clashes, by 11 am reinforcements were flown in to arrest one priest. On 15 December more priests were arrested at Keningau, Tenom and Limbahau. The rest of the priests who only had temporary residence permits, on hearing this has no choice but to say goodbye to their parishioners and went home or were given new assignments to nearby countries. As reported in local news such as Daily Express (p. 2, 11 November 2009), the Malaysian home ministry informed in parliament that a biography of Mustapha's political opponent who died in the Double Six Crash plane crash, Peter Mojuntin, is banned. The reason was that the book "allegedly" recorded that Peter exposed Mustapha's attempt to stop Catholism in Sabah by deporting and arresting foreign missionary priests who were serving their local parishes in the state.

Peter's house was also surrounded by the police after all the priests were arrested because only he dared to voice his opposition to the prosecution of the priests. He was not arrested because of his strong political support from the Kadazan people of Penampang.

While the 20-point agreement had provided that "there should be no any state religion in North Borneo", Mustapha party of USNO including himself is very active in propagating Islam and amend a bill to make Islam as the official religion of the state. He actively sponsored the creation of United Sabah Islamic Association (USIA) on 14 August 1969 which modelled from similar agencies that already existing in West Malaysia. He actively campaigned to persuade non-Muslims to convert to Islam due to what he perceive that the unity can only be achieved through a common religion and language, where he also make the Malay language as the official language of Sabah by limiting the importance of English language. By February 1974, around 75,000 non-Muslim Sabahans had been converted to Islam which rapidly increase to 95,000 in 1975.

Aiding the Moro rebels in the southern Philippines 

During Mustapha term as a Chief Minister of Sabah, he had a vision to make Islam as the majority religion in the state. In order to achieve his aims, he was actively harbouring Muslim refugees from the Philippines especially those of similar ethnic background to himself. Mustapha was also believed to have aiding the Moro in their struggle for independence by providing arms and training facilities in Malaysia. His action were tolerated by the Malaysian government because he was consistent in delivering Muslim votes as well as for his continuous backing of the Malaysian government. He was later successful in making Islam the main religion of Sabah. However, as Malaysian government wanted to maintain good relations between Association of Southeast Asian Nations (ASEAN) with the Philippine central government, the Malaysian government could not raise the plight of Muslim minority in the Philippines. Due to this, Mustapha planned to secede the state of Sabah from Malaysia but his intention failed after he was removed from his position in 1975. The Philippine central government then retracted the Sabah claim in 1977 as a reward for Malaysian government action to stop supporting the southern Philippines Muslim rebels.

Death and legacy 

He died on 2 January 1995 at Sabah Medical Centre, Teluk Likas, Kota Kinabalu, at the age of 76. He was buried at the Muslim cemetery in Kampung Ulu/Ulu Seberang, Putatan, Penampang which was formerly used as a fortress by the late Paduka Mat Salleh and the State Government has named the cemetery "Taman Memorial Tun Datu Haji Mustapha". His memorial is not in Tambunan. The Tun Datu Mustapha Memorial in Tambunan is meant for the distant uncle, Paduka Mat Salleh.

During the 8th Convocation Ceremony of UMS (Universiti Malaysia Sabah) held on 2–3 September 2006, he was conferred the Honorary Degree-Doctor of Philosophy (Social Development)

The state government renamed the Sabah Foundation Building to Tun Mustapha Tower, as a token of appreciation for his contributions to the state.

Tun Mustapha Marine Park, a marine park in Kudat, Sabah was named after him.

A MARA institution boarding school, MRSM Tun Mustapha is named after him in Tawau, Sabah

Honours

Honours of Malaysia 
  : 
  Grand Commander of the Order of the Defender of the Realm (SMN) – Tun (1964)
  :
  Grand Commander of the Order of Kinabalu (SPDK) –  Datuk Seri Panglima (1966)
  :
  Grand Knight of the Order of the Crown of Pahang (SIMP) – formerly Dato', now Dato' Indera (1969)
  :
  Knight Grand Commander of the Order of the Crown of Johor (SPMJ) – Dato' (1970)
  :
  Knight Grand Commander of the Order of the Crown of Selangor (SPMS) – Dato' Seri (1976)
  :
  Knight Grand Commander of the Order of the Crown of Perlis (SPMP) – Dato' Seri (1971)
  :
  Grand Knight of the Order of Cura Si Manja Kini (SPCM) – Dato' Seri (1971)
  :
  Knight Commander of the Order of the Star of Sarawak (PNBS) – Dato Sri

Foreign Honours
 
  Officer of the Order of the British Empire (OBE)

References 

1918 births
1995 deaths
Suluk people
Bajau people
Malaysian Muslims
World War II resistance members
Yang di-Pertua Negeri of Sabah
Chief Ministers of Sabah
Defence ministers of Malaysia
Sabah state ministers
Members of the Dewan Rakyat
Members of the Sabah State Legislative Assembly
Malaysian political party founders
Persecution of Christians
Anti-Christian sentiment in Asia
United Malays National Organisation politicians
United Sabah National Organisation politicians
Grand Commanders of the Order of the Defender of the Realm
Knights Grand Commander of the Order of the Crown of Johor
Grand Commanders of the Order of Kinabalu
Knights Commander of the Most Exalted Order of the Star of Sarawak
Honorary Officers of the Order of the British Empire
Knights Grand Commander of the Order of the Crown of Selangor